Peter Forster may refer to:
 Peter Forster (bishop)
 Peter Forster (actor)
 Peter Forster (geneticist)
 Peter Forster (wood engraver)

See also
 Peter Foster (disambiguation)